Åke Simon Fjästad  (16 December 1887 – 10 March 1956) was a Swedish football player who competed in the 1908 Summer Olympics. In the 1908 tournament he was a part of the Swedish football team that finished in 4th place. His brothers, Nils Fjästad and Per Fjästad, also competed in Olympic Games.

References

External links

1887 births
1956 deaths
Swedish footballers
Sweden international footballers
Olympic footballers of Sweden
Footballers at the 1908 Summer Olympics
Association football defenders
IFK Stockholm players